In international law three categories of Political status are usually recognized:

Independent countries e.g.: France, Canada 
Internal independent countries which are under the protection of another country in matters of defense and foreign affairs, e.g.: Netherlands Antilles, the Faroe Islands, British Virgin Islands etc.
Colonies and other dependent political units e.g. Puerto Rico.

There are, furthermore, several unrecognized countries and independence, secessionist, autonomy and nationalist movements throughout the world. See list of unrecognized countries.

Political status in Northern Ireland
Political Status was an alternative name for Special Category Status.

Political status around the world
Constitutional status of Cornwall
Constitutional status of Orkney, Shetland and the Western Isles
Disputed status of Gibraltar
Disputed status of the isthmus between Gibraltar and Spain
Disputed territories of Northern Iraq
Falkland Islands sovereignty dispute
International recognition of Bangladesh
International recognition of Israel
Legal status of Alaska
Legal status of Germany
Legal status of Hawaii
Legal status of the State of Palestine
Legal status of Texas
Legal status of the Holy See
Political status of Abkhazia and South Ossetia
Political status of Crimea
Political status of Kosovo
Political status of Nagorno-Karabakh
Political status of Kashmir
Political status of Puerto Rico
Political status of Taiwan
Political status of the Azores
Political status of the Cook Islands and Niue
Political status of Transnistria
Political status of Western Sahara
Proposed Darfurian referendum
Secessionism in Western Australia
Status of Jerusalem
Status of territories captured by Israel
Status of the Golan Heights

International law
International relations
Diplomatic recognition
Proposed administrative territorial entities